Lenka Peterson (born Betty Ann Isacson; October 16, 1925 – September 24, 2021) was an American theater, film, and television actress.

Early years
Peterson was born in Omaha, Nebraska, the daughter of Lenke (née Leinweber), a lab technician, and Sven Edward Isacson, a physician. Her father was Swedish, and her mother was Hungarian. She majored in drama at the University of Iowa.

Career 
Peterson had the role of Corliss Archer in a USO-sponsored troupe that performed on military bases in Japan, the Philippines, and other places in the Pacific. In the mid-1940s, she acted with the Berkshire Playhouse stock theater in New Hampshire. She later acted on stage in Pittsburgh, Pennsylvania; Boston, Massachusetts; and Providence, Rhode Island.

One of the first members admitted to New York City's Actors Studio, Peterson's Broadway portrayals included Ella in Sundown Beach (1948), Maude in The Grass Harp (1952), Kitty in The Time of Your Life (1955), Sally and Mary in All the Way Home (1960), Rose in Nuts (1980), and Sarah in Quilters (1984).

Peterson was nominated for a 1985 Tony Award for Best Featured Actress in a Musical for her role in Quilters. She guest starred in such early television productions as Hallmark Hall of Fame (1952), The Philco Television Playhouse (1955), and Actors Studio (1949 and 1950).

On television, she portrayed Faye Banister on the NBC drama Young Dr. Malone (1958), Martha Skerba on the ABC serial A Time for Us (1964), Doris Bonino on the NBC comedy Bonino (1953) and Eve Morgan on the ABC comedy Love, Sidney (1981) and was a cast member of the series Herb Shriner Time (1951), Search for Tomorrow, playing Isabel Moore in 1962 and Evelyn Reedy in 1977, A Flame in the Wind, Another World as Marie Fenton from 1983 to 1984 and later Lorna Devon's adopted grandmother, and Code of Vengeance.

Personal life and death 
On May 8, 1948, Peterson married Daniel O'Connor in Omaha, Nebraska. Peterson is the mother of actress Glynnis O'Connor and Darren O'Connor (and three more children) by O'Connor, who died in 2015.

Peterson died peacefully in her sleep at her home in Roxbury, Connecticut.  She was 95.

Filmography

References

External links
 
 
 
 Lenka Peterson papers, 1943-1996, held by the Billy Rose Theatre Division, New York Public Library for the Performing Arts
Lenka Peterson at the University of Wisconsin's Actors Studio audio collection

1925 births
2021 deaths
Actresses from Omaha, Nebraska
American film actresses
American soap opera actresses
American stage actresses
American television actresses
American people of Swedish descent
American people of Hungarian descent
21st-century American women